Greenville County Courthouse, also known as Greenville Family Courts Building, is a historic courthouse located at Greenville, South Carolina. It was built in 1918, and is a Beaux-Arts style brick and concrete building with terra cotta trim. The building consists of a three-story front section, with an eight-story tower behind.  The building served as the courthouse for Greenville County until 1950 when the court was moved to a new building. The Family Court of Greenville County was located then in the building and remained there until 1991.

It was added to the National Register of Historic Places in 1994.

References

County courthouses in South Carolina
Courthouses on the National Register of Historic Places in South Carolina
Beaux-Arts architecture in South Carolina
Government buildings completed in 1918
National Register of Historic Places in Greenville, South Carolina